In The Mouth of the Crocodile - Live in Seattle is a 2004 live album by Camper Van Beethoven, released on Pitch-A-Tent Records. It captures a performance by the group at the Crocodile Cafe, February 16, 2004.

Track listing
"When I Win the Lottery (Special False Start Mix)"
"Balalaika Gap"
"Tania"
"Tina"
"Waka"
"Eye of Fatima Part 1"
"Eye of Fatima Part 2"
"Flowers"
"Bad Birthday Dedications"
"Oh Death"
"Embarrassing Stage Comments"
"Circles"
"Unabomber Song"
"White Riot"
"(I Was So) Wasted"
"Shut Us Down"
"The History of Utah"
"How to Win Friends and Influence People"
"All Her Favorite Fruit"
"Sweethearts"
"When I Win the Lottery"
"Oh...Uh Canada?"
"Cattle (Reversed)"
"Good Guys and Bad Guys"
"Take the Skinheads Bowling"
"Abundance"
"Thank You We'll Be Here All Week"
"Sad Lover's Waltz"

The album was a limited edition release.

(A medley, not included on the release, of "I Ride My Bike" and "Interstellar Overdrive" was performed as an encore.)

Camper Van Beethoven albums
2004 live albums